The 2010–11 GMHL season was the fifth season of the Greater Metro Junior A Hockey League (GMHL). The thirteen teams of the GMHL played 42-game schedules.

Starting in February 2011, the top teams of the league played down for the Russell Cup, emblematic of the grand championship of the GMHL.  Since the GMHL is independent from Hockey Canada and the Canadian Junior Hockey League, this is where the GMHL's season ended.  The Elliot Lake Bobcats won their first Russell Cup by defeating the South Muskoka Shield 4-games-to-3.

Changes 
Expansion granted to the Shelburne Red Wings.
Expansion granted to the Sturgeon Falls Lumberjacks.
Jamestown Jets join league from Northern Junior Hockey League.
King Wild move to Concord, Ontario and become Vaughan Wild.
Brock Bucks move to Bobcaygeon, Ontario and become Bobcaygeon Bucks.
Innisfil Lakers leave league.

Outdoor game
In mid-January, it was announced that the town of Iron Bridge, Ontario and its 500-seat Outdoor Arena would host a regular season game, known as the North Shore Winter Classic, between the Elliot Lake Bobcats and Algoma Avalanche on January 29, 2011.  This is the first known regulation outdoor game in Ontario in the modern era.  Elliot Lake would win the game 8-2 in front of an estimated 400 fans.

Current standings 
Note: GP = Games played; W = Wins; L = Losses; OTL = Overtime losses; SL = Shootout losses; GF = Goals for; GA = Goals against; PTS = Points; x = clinched playoff berth; y = clinched division title; z = clinched conference title

Teams listed on the official league website.

Standings listed on official league website.

2010-11 Russell Cup Playoffs

Last minute qualifier
One game, winner take all for berth in qualifier round.

Playoff results are listed on the official league website.

Scoring leaders 
Note: GP = Games played; G = Goals; A = Assists; Pts = Points; PIM = Penalty minutes

Leading goaltenders 
Note: GP = Games played; Mins = Minutes played; W = Wins; L = Losses: OTL = Overtime losses; SL = Shootout losses; GA = Goals Allowed; SO = Shutouts; GAA = Goals against average

Awards
Top Defensive Forward - David Sefcik (Elliot Lake Bobcats)
Rookie of the Year - Nikita Jevpalovs (South Muskoka Shield)
Top Forward - Nikita Jevpalovs (South Muskoka Shield)
Most Sportsmanlike Player - Pierre Mathez (Bradford Rattlers)
Top Defenceman - Tyler Nelson (Jamestown Jets)
Most Heart - Mayus Matis (Bradford Rattlers)
Top Goaltender - Rob Sutherland (South Muskoka Shield)
Top Scorer - Stanislav Dzakhov/Alexander Nikulnikov (Shelburne Red Wings)
Most Valuable Player - Alexander Nikulnikov (Shelburne Red Wings)
Coach of the Year - Ryan Leonard (Elliot Lake Bobcats)

See also 
 2010 in ice hockey
 2011 in ice hockey

References 

https://web.archive.org/web/20110306091229/http://gmhl.net/news/league-news/282-russell-cup-playoffs-underway

External links 
 Official website of the Greater Metro Junior A Hockey League

GMHL
Greater Metro Junior A Hockey League seasons